Gancia is an Italian wine-making company which produces a broad range of sparkling and still wines from the Piedmont region.

History
The company was founded in 1850 in Turin by Carlo Gancia. Carlo Gancia is known as the father of Italian sparkling wine, producing the first sparkling wine made with the Classic Method (or Traditional Method) in Piedmont in 1850 on his return from France where he had studied the production techniques of champagne. 

After 15 years of trials and small batches, he commercialized it on a large scale in 1865. This innovative wine is still produced today, a premium Asti DOCG, aged for at least 24 months. 

Due to the complexity of the process Gancia is the only winery producing this product. The company is also known for its Gancia Aperitivo Originale. Like other Italian alcoholic beverages (such as Fernet), the American Gancia is consumed massively in Argentina.

On the occasion of the 170th anniversary of its foundation, the company was honored by the Italian government with the issue of a commemorative stamp reproducing a 1922 advertising poster by Leonetto Cappiello.

Products
Gancia produces still and sparkling wines made from grapes like Brachetto, Chardonnay, Pinot noir, Pinot grigio and Pinot bianco. They also produce Rosso, Bianco and Extra Dry vermouth.

See also

 List of Italian companies

References

External links 

Wineries of Italy
Food and drink companies established in 1850
Italian companies established in 1850
Vermouth
Canelli